Drury is a surname. Notable people with the surname include:

 Adam Drury (disambiguation)
 Alfred Drury (1859–1944), English architectural sculptor
 Allen Drury (1918–1998), American novelist
 Andy Drury (born 1983), English footballer
 Arnold Drury (1912–1995), Australian politician
 Ben Drury (born 1972), British freelance designer
 Brandon Drury (born 1992), American baseball player
 Charles Carter Drury (1846–1914), Canadian Royal Navy admiral
 Charles Drury (1912–1991), Canadian soldier, businessman and politician
 Charlotte Drury (born 1996), American trampoline gymnast
 Chris Drury (artist) (born 1948), British environmental artist
 Chris Drury (born 1976), American ice hockey player
 David Drury (disambiguation)
 Douglas Drury (1914–1967), Canadian bridge player
 Dru Drury (1725–1804), British entomologist
 Sir Drury Curzon Drury-Lowe (1830–1908), British Army lieutenant-general
 Ernest Charles Drury (1878–1968), Premier of Ontario from 1919 to 1923
 Heber Drury (1819–1905), British botanist and Army officer
 Henry Drury (disambiguation)
 Herb Drury (1895–1965), Canadian ice hockey player
 Herbert Drury (gymnast) (1883–1936), British gymnast
 Horace Bookwalter Drury (1888-1968), American economist 
 James Drury (1934–2020), American actor
 John Drury (disambiguation)
 Joseph Drury (1750–1834), headmaster of Harrow school (1785–1805)
 Keith Drury (theologian) (born 1945), American professor of religion
 Maurice O'Connor Drury (1907–1976), English psychiatrist and student of Ludwig Wittgenstein
 Martin Drury (born 1938), British director of the National Trust 1996–2001
 Morley Drury (1903–1989), Canadian American footballer
 Nevill Drury (1947–2013), English editor and publisher
 Newton B. Drury (1889–1978), fourth director of the U.S. National Park Service
 Nigel Drury (1911–1984), Australian politician
 Patrick Drury, Irish actor
 Peter Drury, British television sports commentator
 Robert Drury (disambiguation)
 Shadia Drury (born 1950), Canadian academic
 Shane Drury (1979–2006), professional American rodeo bull rider
 Stephen Drury (disambiguation)
 Susanna Drury (1698–1770), Irish painter
 Ted Drury (born 1971), retired American ice hockey player
 Thomas Drury (disambiguation)
 Timothy Drury (born 1961), British rock musician
 Tom Drury (born 1956), American writer
 William Drury (1527–1579), English statesman
 William O'Bryen Drury (died 1811), senior officer of the British Royal Navy
 William Price Drury (1861–1949), British Royal Marine Light Infantry officer, novelist and playwright

See also
 Dury (disambiguation)